The 2008 FEI World Cup Jumping Final was the 30th final of the FEI World Cup Jumping show jumping series. It was held at the Scandinavium in Gothenburg, Sweden from April 24 to April 27, 2008 for the twelfth time during the 2008 Göteborg Horse Show. Meredith Michaels-Beerbaum of Germany won the event riding Shutterfly. Nobody won.

Results

Round 1
Thirty-nine riders competed in the Table C €110,000 opening round of the 2008 FEI World Cup Jumping Final. Michael Whitaker opened the round, and quickly set the pace by completing a clear round in 75.05 seconds. However, his time was quickly surpassed two riders later when Malin Baryard-Johnsson took nearly four seconds off of Whitaker's time while representing the host nation of Sweden. Shortly after Peter Wylde narrowly took the lead from Baryard-Johnsson, Heinrich Hermann Engemann cleared the course in under seventy seconds to set a new standard. Although Steve Guerdat was also able to clear the seventy second mark, Engemann's time held up as he took the €25,300 first place prize. Two-time champion Marcus Ehning was eliminated after his horse refused twice at the eleventh jump.

Round 2
Thirty-eight riders returned for the Table A €110,000 second round of the 2008 FEI World Cup Jumping Final, with Marcus Ehning being the lone exception following his opening round elimination.

Jump-off

References

World Cup Jumping Final
FEI World Cup Jumping Finals
International sports competitions in Gothenburg
2008 in Swedish sport
April 2008 sports events in Europe
2000s in Gothenburg
Equestrian sports competitions in Sweden